Two by Two (sometimes written as 2x2 or 2By2) is the debut album of English new wave band Blue Zoo. It contains their October 1982 UK top 20 hit single, "Cry Boy Cry".

The album was produced by Talk Talk's Tim Friese-Greene.

Track listing
 "Cry Boy Cry"
 "John's Lost"
 "Far Cry"
 "Count on Me (You Can)"
 "Love Moves in Strange Ways"
 "Forgive and Forget"
 "I'm Your Man"
 "Open Up"
 "Can't Hold Me Down"
 "Something Familiar"
 "Loved One's an Angel" (later CD bonus track)
 "Cry Boy Cry (Long Version)" (later CD bonus track)
 "Somewhere in the World There's a Cowboy Smiling" (later CD bonus track)

References
 The Official Music Master Record Catalogue 16th Edition - John Humphries (Publishing) - 1990 - 

1983 debut albums
Albums produced by Tim Friese-Greene
Blue Zoo albums
Magnet Records albums